Douglas Leslie Palmer (23 June 1930 – 23 November 1992) was an Australian rules footballer who played for Geelong in the Victorian Football League (VFL) during the early 1950s.

Palmer could play as both a centreman and half back flanker. He was a midfielder in Geelong's 1952 premiership side and also played in their losing Grand Final team the following season. Palmer was a good wet weather player.

Palmer was captain / coach of Myrtleford in 1955 and 1956. He was also captain / coach of the Ovens & Murray Football League representative side that lost the 1956 state championships grand final to the Ballarat Football League on the Queen Elizabeth Oval, Bendigo.

References

External links
 

1930 births
Australian rules footballers from Victoria (Australia)
Geelong Football Club players
Geelong Football Club Premiership players
Eaglehawk Football Club players
1992 deaths
One-time VFL/AFL Premiership players